The 2022 Formula Regional Indian Championship was to be a multi-event, Formula Regional open-wheel single seater motor racing championship held across India. This would have been the inaugural season of the championship, and also the first FIA-sanctioned championship held in India, together with its support series, the F4 Indian Championship.

Teams and drivers 
Drivers would have been competing with Alfa Romeo-powered Tatuus F3 T-318 cars run by Prema Powerteam.

Race calendar 
The original 2022 calendar was announced on 19 August 2021, planned to be held over five three-race weekends in February and March of 2022. However, in January 2022, the season was postponed until November because of the pandemic's resurgence.

In March of 2022, a new provisional calendar was announced.

After months without communication from official places, the season was cancelled in late October.

References

2022
FRIC
FRIC